2M is a DOS program by the Spanish programmer Ciriaco García de Celis. It enables higher than normal capacity formatting of floppy disks. It saw active development from 1993 to 1995. The last version, v3.0, was released on 6 March 1995. It was written in C and assembler and compiled using Borland C++ 3.1.

The program consisted of two major components: 2M and 2MGUI (from "2M Guinness"). Of these, 2M was the main program enabling the formatting, reading and writing of high density 3.5" disks formatted to a capacity of either 1804 KiB or 1886 KB, and 2MGUI was a proof-of-concept program that demonstrated the ability to format any normal high density 3.5" disk to a capacity of over two million bytes (1972 KiB) on any disk drive. Both programs implemented disk I/O speedups in the form of "Sector Sliding" and "DiskBoost", which work on the principle of ordering the physical sectors on the disk to facilitate pauseless reading over track changes. 2MGUI utilized bit banging and tricked the floppy controller into writing a full track of data as a single sector before resetting the floppy controller in order to avoid overwriting the next track, enabling the absolute maximum capacity possible at the physical level. A similar technique was also used by Vincent Joguin's Disk2FDI for Amiga floppies.

See also 
 DMF, a high-density diskette format used by Microsoft
 fdformat, a similar program that offers less capacity
 XDF, a high-density diskette format used by IBM

References 
 All information is based on that given in 2M-INFO.EXE supplied with 2M v3.0

External links 
 A direct download link to 2m30.zip
 A direct download link to 2mgui19.zip

1993 software
DOS software